is the second Japanese animated science fantasy action film based on Hiromu Arakawa's Fullmetal Alchemist series, released in 2011. The film was first announced after the airing of the final episode of Fullmetal Alchemist: Brotherhood. The Japanese premiere was on July 2, 2011. Those who attended the movie in theaters in Japan received an exclusive manga volume titled Fullmetal Alchemist Volume 11.5 ~Tabidachi no Mae ni~ (Before Embarking on the Journey).

Funimation has licensed the film and released it in the United States in 2012. The film was distributed by Eleven Arts for North America, showing at more than 100 theaters. In the UK, Manga Entertainment screened the film at BFI South Bank on June 8, 2012, followed by a home video release on September 3, 2012.

Plot

The movie begins with a young girl, Julia Crichton, waking up from a dream about the day her family was forcibly taken from her home by soldiers beside her older brother Ashleigh, who is currently studying their parents' alchemy books. Ashleigh then shows his sister some pages and explains that with the alchemy in the book, he hopes to make a world that no one's seen before. Soon after discovering two strange rubbed-out pages, the siblings hear some strange noises and Ashleigh goes ahead to investigate, but a worried Julia follows to a room where she finds the bodies of her parents hung up and dripping blood. She watches in horror as her brother is attacked and presumably murdered to which she faints.

Years later, a criminal breaks free from prison in Amestris, and the Elric brothers, Edward and Alphonse, join the effort to recapture him. The duo confronts the escapee who proves himself a dangerous opponent able to create ice and lightning from the alchemy circles drawn in blood on the palms of his hands. Despite the Elrics' efforts to capture the criminal, he ends up escaping, and after some investigation with Edward's superior [Roy Mustang] and his lieutenant Riza Hawkeye, they learn that the fugitive, Melvin Voyager, escaped with only six months remaining of his five-year sentence. Among his belongings, they find a newspaper page with a piece cut off, and comparing with an intact copy of the same page, they find that the missing piece is a photo of a young woman named Julia Crichton who was arrested while entering illegally in the remote Table City, set in the border between Amestris and Creta.

Intrigued by the alchemy used by the criminal and his connection with Julia, the Elrics board a train to Table City to investigate further, but the train is attacked by an unknown individual who transforms into a wolf-chimera and takes control of the locomotive. While trying to retake the train's control from the Wolf-Chimera, flying soldiers called the Black Bats attack the train, attempting to rescue what they think are ordinary citizens, but they fall back after finding out the prisoners were Amestrians posing as prisoners as a trap. Meanwhile, Melvin finds his opportunity and escapes, followed after by the Elric Brothers. Ed and Al arrive at a prison, where Melvin destroyed the prison walls to find Julia. Melvin attempts to retrieve Julia, but is interrupted by Miranda, the leader of the Black Bats, who tries to rescue Julia as well. Ed then challenges Melvin while Alphonse goes to save Julia. She and he fall into a village in a vast chasm (The Valley) that surrounds Table City, where Melvin follows and reveals his true identity as Julia's brother, Ashleigh Crichton. Ed then ventures down to The Valley in search of Alphonse, where he learns that Table City was originally the Hill of Milos, until Creta and later Amestris invaded the city and occupied it, forcing the Milosians to live in The Valley, in poverty.

Inside the Black Bats' secret base, Julia and Alphonse develop a friendship while Julia learns about Al and Ed's tragic past of human transmutation. Later, when Ed meets up with Al in the Black Bats base, they find themselves hunted down by wolf chimeras from the Cretan secret police dispatched by Colonel Herschel, the Cretan commander of the area, prompting them to retreat further. They and the Elrics arrive in a room with maps and locations of Table City, where Miranda explains to the Elrics their mission: to reclaim Milos by using the Sanguine Star to control a powerful heat source called Magma. Miranda also explains that the Sanguine Star was a 'red glowing stone of power'. Shocked by the description, the Elrics reveal that the Star might be a Philosopher's Stone, which requires human sacrifice to create. Though shocked at the revelation, Julia is determined to do anything to secure the Milosians' freedom, and Ashleigh agrees to help her.

Wanting to avoid a bloody war, Ed and Al return to Table City in an attempt to find the Star and destroy it. Later that night, the Black Bats begin their assault on Table City. Miranda, Ashleigh, and Julia then venture to the main tower, where, suddenly, Ashleigh fatally injures Miranda and explains to Julia that the use of Miranda's blood activates a three dimensional transmutation circle drawn in blood to create the Sanguine Star. Julia then realizes that he is an impostor, Security Chief Atlas, who was enveloped by alchemy's potential of creation and power and killed Julia's parents for it. He explains that he tore off the real Ashleigh's face and the skin from his lower left side to deceive Julia and create the Star. Ed and Al arrive to rescue Julia and confront Atlas, who escapes to the location of the Star. As Ed, Al, and Julia chase after Atlas, Herschel detonates a Cretan thermal power plant, pouring out a massive amount of lava towards the Valley. Al goes to help save the valley while Ed and Julia go after Atlas. Atlas nearly attempts to retrieve the Star, only to be confronted by Ed and Julia. Julia retrieves the star and decides to save the Valley by swallowing it to use its power.

Meanwhile, Alphonse's attempt to stop the lava are futile until Julia arrives to help him stop the lava. Atlas arrives to take back the Star, only to be confronted by Colonel Herschel, who reveals himself to be the real Ashleigh Crichton. He survived by swallowing a Star and using its power to heal his wounds. Ashleigh then kills Atlas in revenge for the death of his parents. Confirming his identity to Julia while apologizing for leaving her alone for so long to keep her safe from Atlas, Ashleigh tells Julia to come with him to Creta so they can make a world that no one had ever seen before. Julia refuses and decides to fight her brother, with Ed and Mustang arriving to provide assistance. Julia ends the fight by destroying one of Ashleigh's arms. Then, together with Ed and Al, she manages to stop the flow of magma into the Valley. With the Valley safe, Julia uses the rest of her power to heal Ashleigh, restoring his face and saving his life. However, both Ashleigh and Julia's Stars disintegrate, and Julia sacrifices her left leg and glimpses the Gate of Truth. Meanwhile, on the Cretan side of the border, Milosian resistance fighters seize Creta's main base and declare independence. Without Colonel Herschel to lead them, the Cretan forces retreat.

The next morning, Ashleigh wakes up in a hospital bed alongside Julia and is surprised to find his face restored. When Julia wakes up, she is informed that Ashleigh had already left, and is given an automail leg. She then meets Ed and Al as they prepare to leave Table City. Ed chastises Julia, saying that her decision to use the Star was wrong, but he doesn't think she's a bad person. Al promises to Julia that after he and his brother get their bodies back, they will be sure to visit. Julia tells them she will be waiting, as she must stay to lead the Milosians and preserve their newfound independence. Meanwhile, Ashleigh is seen donning his Cretan uniform and returning to Creta. Ed and Al then board a train to Central and take one last look at Table City before leaving.

New characters

She comes from a family of alchemists from Creta, a country on the western border of Amestris, and uses a form of alchemy the Elric brothers are unfamiliar with, allowing her to heal injuries. She was taken in as a child by the residents of Milos, a slum located at the bottom of the trench separating Amestris and Creta, and occupied by Cretan survivors of the skirmish between countries, after her parents were branded as traitors of her country and killed and her brother Ashleigh disappearing. As a member of Milos's resistance against the Amestrian-occupied Table City, she believes the only way to achieve victory is by harnessing the power of the Philosopher's Stone, which she uses to protect Milos from Atlas, a villain posing as her missing brother, and later from her own power-mad brother himself. She uses the rest of the stone's power to save her brother from death by opening the Gate of Truth at the cost of her left leg.

An escaped alchemist who claims to be Julia's long-lost brother Ashleigh. He uses the same form of alchemy Julia practices, which he uses to crystallize water into snow. He is revealed later in the film to be an impostor named , a former guard of the Crichton family, who murdered the real Ashleigh and Julia's parents and disguised himself as Ashleigh by grafting his face onto his own. He serves as the film's primary antagonist, using Julia to help create a Philosopher's Stone so he can keep it for himself. He is killed at the film's climax by the real Ashleigh.

The commanding officer of the Cretan army stationed at the border between Table City and Milos. He wears a white mask that conceals his disfigured face. He is revealed at the climax of the film to be the real , Julia's long-lost older brother, who survived being attacked by Atlas using a Philosopher's Stone kept by his parents. He commands wolf chimeras to search for Julia, and kills Atlas out of revenge for their (Ashleigh and Julia's) parents' murder. However, he also tries to destroy Milos out of bitterness for the city's betrayal of his family, which brings him into conflict with Julia. After he is defeated, Julia saves his life and heals his face by opening the Gate of Truth. After recovering, he leaves the newly established nation of Milos to return to Creta.

A commander of the Black Bats, the rebel faction from Milos that aims to reclaim Table City from its Amestrian occupants. She is killed by Atlas, who uses her blood to help activate the transmutation circle beneath Table City designed to create the Philosopher's Stone.

Development
The idea to create a Fullmetal Alchemist movie set during the second anime's storyline came from the series's producers. The movie's original plot was written by Yuichi Shinbo who also came up with the new characters' names. From there, director Kazuya Murata did research on Spain to develop Table City, intended as a contrast to Amestris, which was based on Germany. Because it was the only time in the series that the main characters traveled to another country, Murata had difficulties concluding it, wondering if it would affect the overarching storyline. Therefore, the story was set during the time Edward realized Alphonse's human body existed somewhere, with the logic that knowledge would encourage him to travel to another area to do research. (This likely places the events of the film somewhere around episode 21 of Brotherhood. Alphonse has learned to transmute with only his hands, but Mustang's subordinates have not yet been split up, definitively placing it somewhere between episodes 15 and 24.) Hiromu Arakawa was not included as part of the staff but was still looking forward to the film.

Music
The official theme song for the movie is "Good Luck My Way" by L'Arc-en-Ciel, which plays over the film's ending credits. The song is the band's fourth contribution to the franchise. On May 30, 2011, singer-songwriter miwa confirmed that she would sing for the opening credits theme, titled "Chasing Hearts".

Specials
To mark the July 2 opening of the Fullmetal Alchemist: The Sacred Star of Milos film, the Pia Eiga Seikatsu website posted an exclusive video "interview" with the stars of the film, Edward and Alphonse Elric (as voiced by Romi Park and Rie Kugimiya, respectively). In keeping with the spirit of Hiromu Arakawa's original manga and the two anime television series, the interviewer has trouble early on in figuring out who the "Fullmetal Alchemist" is. (The interview has cameos by the other stars of the anime.) Also includes 3 "Study" sessions with "Professor" Mustang, teaching Winry and Hawkeye about Creta and Milos.

Reception
In its first weekend, Fullmetal Alchemist: The Sacred Star of Milos earned $1,791,646 despite being exhibited in only 90 screens across Japan, ranking #4 in overall revenue. The film went on to gross $7,401,480 in Japan by the end of 2011. The film also grossed $177,802 in the United States in 2012, bringing the film's total gross to $7,579,282.

The film debuted in North America at the 2011 anime convention Otakon held at the Baltimore Convention Center on July 30. Funimation, in coordination with Aniplex, subtitled the film and held the premiere it the United States only four weeks after the theatrical release in Japan. Funimation licensed the film for the North American market and subsequently provided a limited theatrical release in the United States in early 2012; a home-video release on DVD and Blu-Ray followed. The film won three awards at the Burbank International Film Festival, which hosted the West Coast premiere of the film. It won awards for each of the three categories it was nominated in.

Reception from American critics has been generally positive. It also received a weighted average score of 54 out of 100 on Metacritic based on 7 critics, denoting "mixed or average reviews".

Accolades

References

External links
  
 
 

2011 films
2011 anime films
Anime films based on manga
Aniplex
Bones (studio)
Films directed by Kazuya Murata
Films scored by Taro Iwashiro
Fullmetal Alchemist
Funimation
2010s Japanese-language films
Shochiku films
Toonami